The Herberts is a hamlet in the Vale of Glamorgan, Wales. It is located immediately to the north of the village of St. Mary Church and southwest of Llandough, 2.2 miles by road southwest of the market town centre of Cowbridge along St Athan Road. The River Thaw flows through The Herberts.

Landmarks
The hamlet is especially noted for its old garage whose exterior and maroon and gold decor appears to date back to the 1920s or 1930s. Parwg Well, the Howe Mill and Old Beaupre Castle lie just to the northeast.

References

Villages in the Vale of Glamorgan